

Felbridge is a village and civil parish in the Tandridge district of Surrey with a playing field within its focal area, narrowly in West Sussex.  Felbridge village forms a contiguous settlement with East Grinstead and had 829 homes and households at the time of the 2011 census. Domewood is part of Felbridge civil parish, which was created in 1953.

History

Early history
Until shortly after 1911, the area was part of the parish of Horne. No reference appears to a separate settlement being here in the Domesday Book of 1086.

Post Reformation
James son of Edward Evelyn succeeded to the manors of Hedgecourt (and smaller carucate of Covelingeley) in the parish of Horne and the estate of Felbridge in 1751. Julia Evelyn Medley, his granddaughter by his first wife, who had married Charles Jenkinson, 3rd Earl of Liverpool held this estate, after James's Evelyn wife's death, as late as 1841.

By 1911, whereabouts it lost much of its land, amid the economic change and social reforms of the age it became the property of the Sayer family. The last resident "lord of the manor" was Charles Henry Gatty FRSE FLS who died in 1903.

Geography

It occupies less than one eighth of its district in the extreme mid-south. The east of the village is often referred to as Felcourt.

Elevations range between 115m AOB towards the south of the eastern boundary, fields adjoining Chartham Wood and similarly 102m AOB along West Park Road by the Effingham Park Hotel in the southwest, to 53m AOB along Felbridge Water between Felcourt and Newchapel, in the northeast of the parish, a tributary of the River Eden.

The soil part of a wide  to  band south of the Greensand Ridge is of "slowly permeable loamy/clayey slightly acid but base-rich soil, however much of the southern half is free-draining slightly acid sandy/loamy soil" as this lies on the remaining gentle upland of Hastings Sand.

Localities

Domewood
Domewood is a western neighbourhood surrounded on two of its four sides by copses; it faces, across its southern boundary road, Snow Hill (B2037) the Effingham Park Hotel and Golf Course, see Landmarks; and Snow Hill, a similarly semi-wooded neighbourhood interspersed with farms which is part of an area administered by Worth, West Sussex. Separating Domewood from the village centre are Hedgecourt Lake and small surrounding copses.

Wire Mill lake and inn
Wire Mill forms a separate area which is focussed on and around a short lane, Wire Mill Lane, which ends with the Wire Mill Inn, Toad Hall and Mill End House all overlooking a small weir which releases the water from the Wire Mill Lake.

Landmarks

Felbridge County Primary School
This listed building marks a tapering triangular intersection between the village centre's longest streets, Copthorne Road and Crawley Down road that several times forms the West Sussex boundary. In 1783 James Evelyn (descendant of John Evelyn, the diarist and famous architectural, landscape and cultural figure in Britain) "chose a large house at Hedgecourt Common – arranging for 1½ acres around it to be enclosed and used as a school". The school opened on 4 November 1783 and was substantially enlarged in 1934.

Effingham Park Hotel and Golf Course
This large, complex, building with part-rounded restaurant in a compact 9 hole golf course forms the southwest outcrop of the parish.

St John the Divine parish church
The only church in the village is the Church of England parish church of St John the Divine, known as St John's Felbridge, designed by William White and built in 1865. The construction is a fine example of the Victorian Gothic style. An adjoining church hall was erected in 1965 and refurbished in 2012. The interior of the church was redesigned in 1972-74 and modernised in 2016. The evangelical church is part of the Diocese of Southwark and is a member of the Sussex Gospel Partnership.

Whittington College
The sheltered housing consists of 56 homes, mainly two bedroom bungalows but also large apartments, surrounded by  acres of parkland with an orchard, lake and woodland walks. They are managed by one of the Livery Companies of the City of London, the Mercers' Company. The college was founded under the will of Richard Whittington as a college of priests and almshouse next to the church of St Michael Paternoster Royal in the City of London.

Transport

Road

Rail
Felbridge's nearest railway stations are on the Oxted Line.

Demography and housing
At the United Kingdom Census 2011 its population had risen from 2,039 (ten years before) to 2,096. Greater than the national and local averages, 52.5% of the population described their health as very good.

The civil parish was created in 1953, so the 1951 figure is that of the historic, undivided parish of Horne.

The average level of accommodation in the region composed of detached houses was 28%, the average that was apartments was 22.6%.

The proportion of households in the civil parish who owned their home outright compares to the regional average of 35.1%.  The proportion who owned their home with a loan compares to the regional average of 32.5%.  The remaining % is made up of rented dwellings (plus a negligible % of households living rent-free).

References

External links
Felbridge Village Website

Tandridge
Civil parishes in Surrey